People who were born or lived in Rochester, Minnesota.

Arts, media and music 
Michael York, actor
José Argüelles, author, artist
Dan Bakkedahl, actor, comedian
Amanda Hocking, author
Judy Onofrio, artist
Emily Sandberg, model and actress
Warren Skaaren, screenplay writer, producer
Lea Thompson, actress
John Towey, actor
Sheree J. Wilson, actress
Matt Hauri (Yung Gravy), rapper
Darius Danesh, singer, songwriter, musician, actor, film producer

Science and medicine

Harry Bisel, physician
Sara C. Bisel, physical anthropologist 
Charles Horace Mayo, physician
William James Mayo, physician
William Worrall Mayo, physician
Henry Stanley Plummer, physician
Augustus Stinchfield, physician
Michael Stuart, physician and orthopedic surgeon

Law and politics
Adolph Biermann, Minnesota State Auditor
Harry Blackmun, Associate Justice of the United States Supreme Court
Walter Burdick, Minnesota farmer and legislator
Marshall Burt, Wyoming legislator, first member of the Libertarian Party to be elected to a legislature in over 20 years
Michael C. Burgess, Congressman
Barbara Cegavske, Secretary of State of Nevada, former Nevada legislator
Kerry Conley, Minnesota legislator and businessman
Robert Rankin Dunlap, Minnesota lawyer and legislator
John Moonan Fitzgerald, Minnesota jurist and legislator
Donald T. Franke, Minnesota jurist and legislator
Don Frerichs, Minnesota legislator and businessman
Allen John Furlow, Minnesota Congressman, lawyer, and World War I veteran
Julie Anne Genter, member of the New Zealand House of Representatives representing the Green Party of Aotearoa New Zealand
Gil Gutknecht, member of Congress
Stiles P. Jones, Minnesota state senator and lawyer
John R. Kaley, Minnesota state representative and businessman
Sandy Keith, Lt. Governor and State Supreme Court Chief Justice
Frank B. Kellogg, U.S. Secretary of State
Harold G. Krieger. Minnesota state senator and judge
Gordon Moore (judge), Associate Justice of the Minnesota Supreme Court
Leilani Munter, American stock car driver
Carla Nelson, incumbent Minnesota state senator and former member of the Minnesota House of Representatives
Richard Ojeda, member of the West Virginia Senate and a candidate in the 2020 Democratic Party presidential primaries.
Edward Henry Ozmun, Minnesota lawyer, politician, and diplomat
John Parkin, Wisconsin legislator
John M. Peters, Iowa lawyer and legislator
Mark Piepho, Minnesota legislator and businessman
Nels Pierson, Minnesota legislator
E. William Quirin, Minnesota legislator and businessman
Dave Senjem, incumbent Minnesota state senator, former Majority Leader of the Minnesota Senate, former Minority Leader of the Minnesota Senate
Ozora P. Stearns, U.S. Senator and mayor of Rochester
Ken Zubay, Minnesota legislator and businessman

Sports
Rafael Butler, boxer
Eric Butorac, tennis player
Tyler Cain, basketball player
Phil DuBois, football player
John Fina, football player
Guy Gosselin, hockey player
Sada Jacobson (born 1983), Olympic fencing silver and bronze medalist
Ken Johannson (1930–2018), Canadian-born American ice hockey player, coach and executive
Jim Johannson (1964–2018), American ice hockey player, coach and executive
John Johannson, ice hockey player
Dick Kimball, diving coach
Bryce Lampman, hockey player
Bethanie Mattek-Sands, tennis player
Scott Muller, canoer
Shjon Podein, hockey player
John Pohl, hockey player
Michael Restovich, baseball player
Bob Schmidt, football player
Aaron Senne, baseball player
Marcus Sherels, football player
Jeff Siemon, football player
Tommy Speer, fighter
Eric Strobel, hockey player
Colin Stuart, hockey player
Mark Stuart, hockey player
Mike Stuart, hockey player
Darrell Thompson, football player
Ben Utecht, football player
Doug Zmolek, hockey player

Other 
Fred Hargesheimer, pilot, philanthropist
John Jeremiah Lawler, Roman Catholic bishop
Mary Alfred Moes, Roman Catholic nun
Curt Rice, Norwegian linguist and rector of the Norwegian University of Life Sciences
Sarah Burger Stearns, co-founder and first president of the Minnesota Woman Suffrage Association
Igor Vovkovinskiy, tallest man in U.S.

References

Rochester, Minnesota
Rochester